The Embassy of Azerbaijan in London is the diplomatic mission of Azerbaijan in the United Kingdom. Diplomatic relations between the two countries were established in 1992 and the Azeri embassy in London established in 1994. The current ambassador is Elin Suleymanov.

Gallery

See also
 List of diplomatic missions of Azerbaijan
 List of diplomatic missions in the United Kingdom
 Azerbaijan–United Kingdom relations

References

External links
Official site 

1994 establishments in the United Kingdom
United Kingdom
Azerbaijan
Buildings and structures in the Royal Borough of Kensington and Chelsea
Azerbaijan–United Kingdom relations
South Kensington